Deep Space Navigator is a 1983 board game published by Tactical Templates.

Gameplay
Deep Space Navigator is a science fiction board game, a tactical space game of ship to ship combat.

Reception
Tony Watson reviewed Deep Space Navigator in Space Gamer No. 67. Watson commented that "Deep Space Navigator'''s template is a novel addition to the standard panoply of game components, but alone, it's not enough to carry the title. If the designers had followed through on their work, DSN could have been a very good game. As it is, it is naggingly incomplete, and can't be recommended."

ReviewsAsimov's Science Fiction'' v8 n3 (1984 03)

References

Board games introduced in 1983